Alströmer is a Swedish surname. Notable people with the surname include:

Clas Alströmer (1736–1794), Swedish naturalist
Jonas Alströmer (1685–1761), Swedish pioneer of agriculture and industry
Jonas Alströmer (1877–1955), Swedish diplomat
Margareta Alströmer (1763–1816), Swedish painter and concert singer

Swedish-language surnames